The Bassin Rond is a pond located beside the Canal de la Sensée as it  joins the Canal de l'Escaut near Estrun, France.

Lakes of Hauts-de-France
Landforms of Nord (French department)